Vedum is a locality situated in Vara Municipality, Västra Götaland County, Sweden with 926 inhabitants in 2010.

The company Vedum Kök och Bad AB, a manufacturer of kitchen and bathroom appliances, is located in Vedum.

The locality grew up around a station on the railway line Herrljunga - Uddevalla, which was opened in 1866. The originally narrow gauge railway was rebuilt to standard gauge in 1899-1900 and trains still call at Vedum. The station building played an important part in the film comedy "Stinsen brinner" (The Station Master is on Fire) from 1991.

References 

Populated places in Västra Götaland County
Populated places in Vara Municipality